{{Speciesbox
|image = 20200423124620 ed1.jpg
|taxon = Chaenomeles japonica
|authority = (Thunb.) Lindl. ex Spach
|synonyms_ref = <ref name="77105966-1" >{{cite web |url=http://powo.science.kew.org/taxon/urn:lsid:ipni.org:names:77105966-1#synonyms |title=Chaenomeles japonica (Thunb.) Lindl. ex Spach |author= |date=2017 |website=Plants of the World Online |publisher=Board of Trustees of the Royal Botanic Gardens, Kew |access-date=12 December 2020 }}</ref>
|synonyms = }}Chaenomeles japonica, called the Japanese quince or Maule's quince, is a species of flowering quince that is native to Japan. 

It is a thorny deciduous shrub that is commonly cultivated. It is shorter than another commonly cultivated species C. speciosa, growing to only about 1 m in height. It is best known for its colorful spring flowers, which are red, white, pink or multicoloured.

Description
It is a bulky shrub with thorns and widely spreading branches, which reaches heights of growth of 0.6 to 2.0 meters. The leaves are lanceolate to obovate, roughly toothed and glabrous even when young. They are 4 to 5 inches long and 2 to 3 inches wide, including the petiole. The unusually large stipules are 1 centimeter long and 1.5 to 2 centimeters wide, kidney-shaped and serrated on the edge; they are only found on long shoots.Bailey, L.H.; Bailey, E.Z.; the staff of the Liberty Hyde Bailey Hortorium. 1976. Hortus third: A concise dictionary of plants cultivated in the United States and Canada. Macmillan, New York.  

It blooms in winter, before leaf budding; it blooms again in summer but with less abundance. Usually there are 2 to 3 flowers arranged together; they are coloured orange to brick red. When open, the flowers are 3 to 4 centimeters wide. The fruit is called  in Japanese. It produces apple-shaped fruit, 4 to 7 centimeters in diameter, that are a golden-yellow color containing red-brown seeds.

Uses
The fruit is edible, but hard and astringent, unless bletted or cooked. The fruits are not edible raw, but as with all fruits of the rose family, the pulp is non-toxic and the kernels contain small amounts of poison. The fruit is occasionally used in jam, jelly and pie making as a substitute for its cousin, the true quince, Cydonia oblonga. C. japonica is also popularly grown in bonsai. It accepts all types of soil, but grows very slowly in calcareous soil.

Gallery

References

External linksInformation from Plants for a Future''

japonica